Abū Zayd Sa’īd ibn Aws al-Anṣārī (died 830 CE/215 AH) was an Arab linguist and a reputable narrator of hadith. Sibawayh and al-Jāḥiẓ were among his pupils.
His father was Aws ibn Thabit also a hadith narrator, while his grandfather Thabit ibn Bashir was one of the three scribes who wrote down the Qur'an during Muhammad's era.

He died in Basra, Iraq.

References 

830 deaths
Year of birth unknown
Medieval grammarians of Arabic
Arab grammarians
Hadith narrators